Tobias Killer (born August 20, 1993) is a German footballer who plays as a midfielder who plays for Bayernliga club SV Donaustauf. He appeared in the 3. Liga for SpVgg Unterhaching.

External links

1993 births
People from Memmingen
Sportspeople from Swabia (Bavaria)
Footballers from Bavaria
Living people
German footballers
Association football midfielders
TSV 1860 Munich II players
SpVgg Unterhaching II players
SpVgg Unterhaching players
Regionalliga players
3. Liga players
Bayernliga players
Landesliga players